The 1973 Pacific Southwest Open – Men's singles was an event of the 1973 Pacific Southwest Open tennis tournament and was played on outdoor hard courts at the Los Angeles Tennis Center in Los Angeles, California, in the United States, between September 17 and September 23, 1973. The draw comprised 64 players of which 16 were seeded. Eight players qualified via a 64-man qualifying and a 203-man pre-qualifying event. Stan Smith was the defending Pacific Southwest Open champion but was defeated in the quarterfinals. Unseeded Jimmy Connors won the title by defeating unseeded Tom Okker in the final, 7–5, 7–6(11–9).

Seeds

Draw

Finals

Top half

Section 1

Section 2

Bottom half

Section 3

Section 4

References

External links
 ITF tournament edition details

Los Angeles Open (tennis)
Pacific Southwest Open
Pacific Southwest Open